Cittotaenia is a genus of tapeworms belonging to the family Anoplocephalidae.

The genus has almost cosmopolitan distribution.

Species:

Cittotaenia denticulata 
Cittotaenia krishnai

References

Cestoda